Baring is an unincorporated community in Saskatchewan. It is located southeast of Grenfell, just off Highway 47.

Chester No. 125, Saskatchewan
Unincorporated communities in Saskatchewan
Division No. 5, Saskatchewan